Uncivilised is a 1936 Australian film directed by Charles Chauvel. It was an attempt by Chauvel to make a more obviously commercial film, and was clearly influenced by Tarzan.

The film is known as Uncivilized and Pituri in the United States.

Plot summary 
Successful author Beatrice Lynn is commissioned by her publisher to go to the Outback and locate the "legendary" white man, Mara, who heads an Aboriginal Australian tribe. Travelling by camel, she is abducted by an Afghan cameleer, Akbar Jhan. He and his group of Aboriginal people provide pituri, a narcotic, to other Aboriginal people.  Previously not allowed into Mara's tribal land to sell his wares, Akbar Jhan has schemed to use Beatrice, a white woman, to arouse Mara's interest.

Meanwhile, the Australian Mounted Police has its hands full with a missing inspector, an international drug ring, and a tribe of Aboriginal warriors led by Moopil who have killed two prospectors, as well as searching for the missing Beatrice.

Mara buys Beatrice from Jhan, and the two fall in love.

Cast 
Margot Rhys as Beatrice Lynn
Dennis Hoey as Mara the White Chief
Ashton Jarry as The Mounted Policeman – posing as Akbar Jhan the White Slaver
Marcelle Marnay as Sondra the Half-Caste
Kenneth Brampton as Trask the Opium Smuggler
Victor Fitzherbert as John Hemmingway, publisher
Edward Howell as Vitchi the Witch Doctor
Edward Sylveni as Salter
Frank Dwyer as Bloom, a prospector
Rita Aslim as Nardin
John Fernside as Captain
Jessica Malone as Hemmingway's Secretary
Richard Mazar as Tong
Z. Gee as Tiki
David McNiven
Norman Rutledge
 Bill Onus, as one of the Aboriginal men

Production
After making Heritage, Expeditionary Films were in an expansive mood and increased their capital from £15,000 to £50,000. They announced they had signed a contract with E. V. Timms to provide a story, and also planned to make a movie about contemporary city life. The second project was never made.

In July 1935 Chauvel announced the film would be called Uncivilised and concern a white man who grows up among Aboriginal people in North Queensland. By October he had cast Margot Rhys, who had been in Heritage, and Dennis Hoey, who was imported from England.

Chauvel commenced location filming on Palm Island that month. Location shooting went for six weeks, with the use of Aboriginal actors strictly controlled by the Aboriginal Control Board.

Interior scenes were shot at the newly constructed National Studios at Pagewood – it was the first production shot there. Aboriginal actors were brought down from Queensland to act in the studio scenes.

During filming, an animal trainer was attacked by a python, but he recovered and went back to work. After ten weeks in the studio, Chauvel then shot additional scenes at the Burragorang Valley and the Royal National Park.

Release
Chauvel showed preview scenes to the press in May.

Uncivilised had to have two scenes excised by the censor for export. One scene was Margot Rhys swimming in the nude, another was a strangulation of an aborigine. No cuts were required in Victoria.

Reviews were mixed.

US Release
The film was released in the US and performed well at the box office. However Expeditionary Films had sold the rights and benefited little from this. The company soon wound up and made no more movies.

The film was re-released in Los Angeles in March 1942 as Pituri and played on a double bill with Black Dragons. The Los Angeles Times called it "a fast moving story whose elements maybe a little shopworn but which appeared new against the unusual background... picture proves that when the Australians get into their real stride as picture makers they will be second to none: for acting, production and photography are second to none." This version screened in New York the following year.

The film is now in the public domain.

Soundtrack 
Dennis Hoey's Mala character sings several songs in the manner of Paul Robeson.

Novel
A novelisation of the script was published in 1936. Authorship was attributed solely to Charles Chauvel but it is believed the book was written by Timms.

Notes

External links 

Uncivilised at Oz Movies

Review of film at Variety

Novelisation
Serialisation of novel in The Land 6 Aug 1937 to 11 Feb 1938 – 6 Aug, 13 Aug, 20 Aug, 27 Aug, 3 Sept, 10 Sept, 17 Sept, 24 Sept, 1 Oct, 8 Oct, 15 Oct, 22 Oct, 29 Oct, 5 Nov, 12 Nov, 19 Nov, 26 Nov, 3 Dec, 10 Dec, 17 Dec, 31 Dec, 7 Jan, 14 Jan, 28 Jan, 4 Feb, 11 Feb

1936 films
Australian black-and-white films
1936 adventure films
Australian adventure films
1930s English-language films
English-language adventure films